The 2004 Major League Lacrosse season was the fourth season of the league. The season began on May 22 and concluded with the championship game on August 22, 2004.

General information
The Bridgeport Barrage relocated to Philadelphia and became the Philadelphia Barrage before the season started. They played their home games at Villanova Stadium.

The Baltimore Bayhawks moved their home games to Johnny Unitas Stadium. The Boston Cannons moved theirs to Nickerson Field. The New Jersey Pride moved theirs to Sprague Field.

Major League Lacrosse played the first-ever regular season games in the western United States as Baltimore defeated Rochester by a 24-18 margin in Seahawks Stadium in Seattle on May 22. Baltimore defeated New Jersey 22-19 on June 5 at INVESCO Field in Denver.

Regular season
W = Wins, L = Losses, PCT= Winning Percentage, PF= Points For, PA = Points Against

Rochester defeated Baltimore 2 of 3 regular season games.

All Star Game
There was no game played

Playoffs
Semifinal games August 20, 2004

Philadelphia 18-17 Rochester  @ Nickerson Field, Boston, Massachusetts
Boston 24-16 Baltimore  @ Nickerson Field, Boston, Massachusetts

MLL Championship August 22, 2004

Philadelphia 13-11 Boston @ Nickerson Field, Boston, Massachusetts

Bracket

Awards

Weekly Awards
The MLL gave out awards weekly for the best offensive player, best defensive player and best rookie. No Rookie of the Week award was given Weeks 1 and 2; rookies did not play until after the Collegiate Draft on June 3.

4
Major League Lacrosse